The 1999 European Judo Championships were the 10th edition of the European Judo Championships, and were held in Bratislava, Slovakia from 22 May to 23 May 1999.

Medal overview

Men

Women

Medals table

Results overview

Men

60 kg

66 kg

73 kg

81 kg

90 kg

100 kg

+100 kg

Open class

Women

48 kg

52 kg

57 kg

63 kg

70 kg

78 kg

+78 kg

Open class

References

External links
 

E
Judo Championships
European Judo Championships
J
Sports competitions in Bratislava
1990s in Bratislava
Judo competitions in Slovakia
May 1999 sports events in Europe